Carpo , also , is a small outer natural satellite of Jupiter. It was discovered by a team of astronomers from the University of Hawaii led by Scott S. Sheppard in 2003, and was provisionally designated as  until it received its name in early 2005. It was named in March 2005 after Carpo, one of the Horae, and a daughter of Zeus (Jupiter).

Like all irregular moons of Jupiter, Carpo's orbit is highly variable over time due to gravitational perturbations by the Sun and other planets.

Carpo was long thought to be an outlier prograde satellite not part of any group, until S/2018 J 4 was found. The orbital inclination of satellites such as Carpo is limited by the Kozai effect, which induces a periodic exchange between the inclination and eccentricity of the orbit. If the inclination is large enough, the eccentricity can in turn grow so large that the periapsis of the satellite (called the perijove in the case of moons of Jupiter) would be in the immediate vicinity of the Galilean moons (Io, Europa, Ganymede and Callisto). The satellite would eventually collide with one of these, or a close encounter would eject it altogether from the Jovian system. Due to the Kozai effect, Carpo's argument of periapsis never precesses and instead librates about 90° with respect to the ecliptic, which keeps Carpo's perijove always above Jupiter and its apojove below (see orbit animation below).

References

External links
Jupiter's Known Satellites (by Scott S. Sheppard)

Moons of Jupiter
Irregular satellites
Discoveries by Scott S. Sheppard
Astronomical objects discovered in 2003
Moons with a prograde orbit